César Gelabert Piña (born 31 October 2000) is a Spanish footballer who plays as an attacking midfielder for CD Mirandés.

Club career
Born in Palencia, Castile and León, Gelabert joined Real Madrid's La Fábrica in 2015, from Hércules CF. He made his senior debut with the reserves on 25 February 2018 at the age of just 17, coming on as a late substitute in a 3–0 Segunda División B home win against Pontevedra CF.

Gelabert was definitely promoted to Castilla in June 2018, but suffered a knee injury which kept him sidelined for the most of the season. After subsequently overcoming another injury, he scored his first senior goal on 3 November 2019, netting Castilla's first in a 2–4 away loss against Sporting de Gijón B.

After attracting interest from several clubs across Europe during the 2020 summer, Gelabert opted to stay, but was unable to establish himself as a regular starter during the campaign. On 5 August 2021, he signed a two-year deal with Segunda División side CD Mirandés.

Gelabert made his professional debut on 16 August 2021, starting in a 0–0 away draw against Málaga CF.

International career
Gelabert represented Spain at under-17 level in the 2017 UEFA European Under-17 Championship and the 2017 FIFA U-17 World Cup squads, winning the former competition. Initially called up with the under-19s for the 2019 UEFA European Under-19 Championship, he was forced to miss out the competition due to a broken clavicle.

References

External links
Real Madrid profile

2000 births
People from Palencia
Sportspeople from the Province of Palencia
Spanish footballers
Footballers from Castile and León
Association football midfielders
Segunda División players
Segunda División B players
Real Madrid Castilla footballers
CD Mirandés footballers
Spain youth international footballers
Living people